Dan Alexander may refer to:

 Dan Alexander (offensive lineman) (born 1955), American football offensive lineman
 Dan Alexander (fullback) (born 1978), American football fullback